Lee Jae-won (hangul: 이재원; hanja: 李在元; born 5 April 1980) is a  South Korean DJ and singer. He is the former member of Korean groups H.O.T. and jtL.

Career

Solo
In 2005, Lee released his first solo album, No Pain, No Gain. The album received disappointing sales. In 2007, he released his second album Lee Jae Won Vol. 1.5 the single "I'm So Hot" which a part of the song samples a rhythm from Mariah Carey's It's Like That. Again the album received disappointing sales. In 2008, he was accused of rape and was arrested. The charges were dropped 3 hours later, but because of the event, he was unable to release his next album. In 2012, Jae Won released his new album in Chinese language. The album title is It's the time. It's received a positive response from fans in China. During his comeback performance, it was speculated that he will be planning to bring back the H.O.T. group to make a new album.

Military service
In 2009, Lee enlisted for his compulsory military service, where he served for 22 months at the Ministry of National Defense in Yongsan-gu, Seoul. He was discharged on 7 March 2011 to an H.O.T. Reunion.

Personal life 
On 10 January 2015, Lee's representatives announced that the singer was diagnosed with thyroid cancer in April of the previous year.

Discography

Studio albums

References

1980 births
Living people
H.O.T. (band) members
Rappers from Seoul
Singers from Seoul
South Korean male idols
South Korean male rappers
South Korean male pop singers
South Korean male television actors
South Korean male musical theatre actors
20th-century South Korean male singers
21st-century South Korean male singers